Errastunus is a genus of true bugs belonging to the family Cicadellidae.

The species of this genus are found in Europe and Northern America.

Species:
 Errastunus daedaleus Logvinenko, 1966 
 Errastunus leucophaeus (Kirschbaum, 1868)

References

Cicadellidae
Hemiptera genera